Oscar Camenzind (born 12 September 1971 in Schwyz, Switzerland) is a former professional road racing cyclist from Switzerland. He became national road champion in 1997. In 1998 he won the World Road Championship and the Giro di Lombardia, in 2000 the Tour de Suisse and Liège–Bastogne–Liège in 2001. His career came to an abrupt end when he retired from pro cycling after a positive doping test in July 2004 for erythropoietin, leading into the Athens Olympics. After confessing to the use, in 2005 he was sued in Swiss court in order to name his supplier, which he refused to do fearing retribution.

Major Results

1989
 2nd Road race, National Junior Road Championships
1994
 2nd GP Palio del Recioto
1996
 2nd GP d'Europe
 2nd Overall GP Tell
1st Stages 3b & 4
 2nd À travers Lausanne
 2nd Josef Voegeli Memorial
 3rd Wartenberg Rundfahrt
 7th Overall Giro di Puglia
1997
 1st  Road race, National Road Championships
 1st Overall GP Tell
1st Stage 2b
 1st Breitling Grand Prix
 2nd Overall Tour de Suisse
1st Stages 1 & 9
 3rd Overall Tour of Austria
1st Stage 5
 2nd Rominger Classic
 4th Rund um Köln
 4th À travers Lausanne
 4th Josef Voegeli Memorial
1998
 1st  Road race, UCI Road World Championships
 1st Giro di Lombardia
 2nd Milano–Torino
 2nd Tour de Berne
 3rd GP du canton d'Argovie
 4th Overall Giro d'Italia
 6th Trofeo Melinda
1999
 1st Stage 3 Giro del Trentino
 3rd Tour de Berne
 4th Giro di Lombardia
 4th La Flèche Wallonne
 4th Breitling Grand Prix
 5th Overall Tour de Suisse
1st Stage 7
 5th Overall Tour de Romandie
 6th Road race, UCI Road World Championships
 8th Liège–Bastogne–Liège
 9th Josef Voegeli Memorial
2000
 1st  Overall Tour de Suisse
 2nd À travers Lausanne
 2nd EnBW Grand Prix
 7th Züri-Metzgete
2001
 1st Liège–Bastogne–Liège
 1st Stage 10 Tour de Suisse
 3rd Luk-Cup Bühl
 7th Overall Tirreno–Adriatico
 10th Overall Tour de Romandie
2002
 1st  Overall Sachsen Tour International
1st Stage 2
 2nd Milano–Torino
 3rd Giro di Lombardia
 3rd Overall Vuelta a Murcia
 8th Züri-Metzgete
 9th Overall Tour Méditerranéen
2003
 1st Stage 3 Sachsen Tour International
 7th Züri-Metzgete
 3rd Coppa Placci
 4th Road race, National Road Championships
 4th Tre Valli Varesine
 4th Giro del Veneto
 9th Giro dell'Emilia
 7th Trofeo Matteotti
2004
 3rd Road race, National Road Championships
 3rd Trofeo Matteotti

Grand Tour general classification results timeline

See also
 List of doping cases in cycling
List of sportspeople sanctioned for doping offences

References

External links

1971 births
Living people
Doping cases in cycling
Swiss male cyclists
Swiss sportspeople in doping cases
Olympic cyclists of Switzerland
Cyclists at the 2000 Summer Olympics
UCI Road World Champions (elite men)
Sportspeople from the canton of Schwyz
Tour de Suisse stage winners